Bezujiq (also Romanized as Bezūjīq; also known as Bezūjeq) is a village in Qaranqu Rural District, in the Central District of Hashtrud County, East Azerbaijan Province, Iran. At the 2006 census, its population was 215, in 39 families.

References 

Towns and villages in Hashtrud County